Zielonowo  is a village in the administrative district of Gmina Wieleń, within Czarnków-Trzcianka County, Greater Poland Voivodeship, in west-central Poland.

Notable residents 
 Friedrich Wilhelm Kritzinger (1890 - 1947), civil servant, participant of the Wannsee conference

References

Zielonowo